Pueblo Community College (PCC) is a public community college in Pueblo, Colorado.

History

Pueblo Community College (PCC) traces its history to the founding of Southern Colorado Junior College (SCJC) in 1933. In 1937 SCJC became part of the Pueblo County Junior College District, and was renamed Pueblo Junior College. In 1961 the college district was dissolved by the General Assembly and the Junior College became the four-year Southern Colorado State College (SCSC). In the 1970s, SCSC opened a branch institution, the College for Community Services and Career Education, that in 1978 was re-organized by the General Assembly into a separate entity and renamed in 1979 to Pueblo Vocational Community College under the Colorado Community College System. In 1982 it was renamed to Pueblo Community College.

In 2006, college president Mike Davis was confirmed to have died in a plane crash while traveling to Pueblo's branch campus in Durango, Colorado. He had been a college president for five years and previously had served as an administrator at Vincennes University.

Academics

As of 2010 the college has an enrollment of 6,592 students spread over four campuses in the Pueblo region. The college was accredited by The Higher Learning Commission of the North Central Association of Colleges and Schools in 1979.

In 2006, Pueblo Community College opened to high school students from Dolores Huerta Preparatory High School and other local Pueblo area high schools. The Early College Program (ECP) allows high school students to enroll in collegiate level coursework at nearly no cost to the student. PCC confers degrees awarded to high school students every year. In 2013, PCC awarded degrees to over 30 high school students.

Pueblo Community College Health Clinic

In 2008, PCC opened a new health clinic for its students to provide low-cost basic health services to its students. PCC also opened a new student cafeteria named Pueblo Joe's as part of President Garvin's "vision of a college that's more comfortable for students and a resource for the entire community.".

References

External links

 Official website

Colorado Community College System
Pueblo, Colorado
Education in Pueblo County, Colorado
Education in Fremont County, Colorado
Educational institutions established in 1933
1933 establishments in Colorado